Donna Becker (born August 6, 1932) is a former pitcher who played in the All-American Girls Professional Baseball League. She batted and threw right handed.

According to All-American Girls Professional Baseball League data, Becker was assigned to the Kalamazoo Lassies club in its 1951 season. Nevertheless, she did not have individual records or some information was incomplete  at the time of the request.

The All-American Girls Professional Baseball League folded in 1954, but there is now a permanent display at the Baseball Hall of Fame and Museum at Cooperstown, New York since November 5, 1988 that honors those who were part of this unique experience. Donna, along with the rest of the girls and the league staff, is included at the display/exhibit.

Sources

1932 births
Living people
All-American Girls Professional Baseball League players
Baseball players from Wisconsin
Sportspeople from Kenosha, Wisconsin
Baseball pitchers
Kalamazoo Lassies players
21st-century American women